Karthik Netha is a poet, lyricist, best known for his Tamil language film songs.  His notable works includes the songs from the movies like 96, Thirumanam Enum Nikkah, Nedunchaalai, Dear Comrade, Monster.

Biography
Karthik Netha, born in Chinnanur, a village in Salem district, Tamilnadu. Parents Mr. Rathinam, Advocate and Mrs.Jayamani , Retired Senior Health Nurse(Tamilnadu Government). Karthik Netha's elder brother  Ashok Prasanna is a software engineer and younger brother  Vivek Prasanna is an actor.

In 2019, he fell in love with "Geetha", a Tamil teacher  and married her at the end of the year. The couple is blessed with a son named  "Gurumouni Prasanna"

Karthik Netha's first song "Intha Ooru" from the Tamil movie "Thotti Jaya" was released in 2005.​ He worked as an assistant to lyricists Mr.Arivumathi and Mr.Na.Muthukumar.

Karthik Netha has published five books of poetry. 

1.தவளைக்கல் சிறுமி (Thavalaikkal Sirumi)

2.தேனை ஊற்றித் தீயை அணைக்கிறான் திகம்பரன் (Thenai ootri Theeyai Anakkiran Thigambaran) 

3.தற்கண்ட தூயம் (Tharkanda Thooyam)

4.ஞாலப்பெரிதே ஞானச் சிறுமலர் (Gnalapperithey Gnana Sirumalar)

5.மீதாந்த மூகம் (Meethantha Mugam)

Filmography

Lyricist
All the songs written by Karthik Netha is available as YouTube and Spotify  Playlists 

Karthik Netha Songs YouTube Playlist

Karthik Netha Songs Spotify Playlist

Awards and nominations 
2019 - Filmfare Awards South - Best Lyricist (Tamil) - Won
2021 - SIIMA Award for Best Lyricist- Tamil - nom for "Andhi Malai" from Monster
2022 - SIIMA Award for Best Lyricist - Tamil. (Netrikan - Ithuvum kadanthu pogum song).

References

External links 

Karthik Netha at Twitter
Karthik Netha at Instagram

Living people
Tamil film poets
Indian male poets
Indian lyricists
Poets from Tamil Nadu
People from Salem, Tamil Nadu
Filmfare Awards South winners
1984 births